The field elm cultivar Ulmus minor 'Ademuz' was cloned by root cuttings from a tree assumed to be growing in or near the eponymous town 100 km north-west of Valencia, Spain. The tree was discovered in 1996 by Margarita Burón of the Escuela Técnica Superior de Ingenieros de Montes, Universidad Politėcnica de Madrid (UPM). 'Ademuz' is one of a number of U. minor clones found to have a very high resistance to Dutch Elm Disease, on a par with, if not greater than, the hybrid cultivar 'Sapporo Autumn Gold' grown as a control. In the Madrid study, the appearance of the tree was rated 4.5 / 5, the most attractive of the seven selected cultivars.

Propagation of 'Ademuz' is protected by an EU Grant of Rights, given on 02/07/2018 under Grant ref. 49920.

'Ademuz' was introduced to the UK in 2014, by Hampshire & Isle of Wight Branch, Butterfly Conservation, as part of an assessment of DED-resistant cultivars as potential hosts of the endangered White-letter Hairstreak.

Description
No description of the original tree or its location survives, as Buron died in a road accident before she was able to record details. The clones at Puerta de Hierro, Madrid, grew at 100 cm per annum, the fastest of the seven U. minor clones under assessment. The tree is usually monopodial to a height of five metres, its branches devoid of corky tissue. The leaves, on 5 mm petioles, are ovate, typically acuminate at the apex, the average length and width 54 × 34 mm, the margins doubly serrate. Foliar density relative to 'Sapporo Autumn Gold' is described as 'medium'. Leaf bud-burst in early April in Spain  (late April in southern England) was late relative to the other Madrid clones save 'Majadahonda'. The samarae are typically 15 mm long by 10 mm broad, the seed central, and the notch distinctively circular; they are shed in late April in southern England. DNA analysis by UPM in 2019 has confirmed that 'Ademuz' is pure Ulmus minor. Specimens grown in southern England attained sexual maturity aged eight years, commencing flowering in late February (week 8).

Pests and diseases
In inoculation trials conducted in 2008, 'Ademuz' sustained approximately 10% damage (assumed to be wilting rather than die-back) against a score of c. 45% for the benchmark-resistant cultivar 'Sapporo Autumn Gold'. In 2009 'Ademuz' scored c. 18%, and Sapporo c. 21%. Ergo, 'Ademuz'  would appear to have a level of resistance unprecedented in a European species. However, in Italian elm trials, some Spanish U. minor clones have shewn a greater  susceptibility to elm yellows, a phytoplasma not known in either the UK or Spain, than those of any other provenance. Whether 'Ademuz' shares this susceptibility has yet to be established.

Cultivation
The location of the parent tree is not known but assumed to be in or near the eponymous town in the province of Valencia. According to Köppen climate classification, Ademuz has a humid subtropical (Cfa) climate, with an average annual temperature of 11.8 °C and a precipitation of 492 mm, mostly falling in fall and spring, summer being the driest season. Owing to an elevation of 719 m and interior location, frosts and snowfall are common in winter. https://es.climate-data.org/

'Ademuz' has been widely planted in England since 2014, notably thriving at four sites in Hampshire, as part of Butterfly Conservation'''s elm trials, where the rainfall is approximately double the Valencia total, and geology ranges from chalk to impermeable clays. 'Ademuz' has proven particularly resilient where exposed to sea winds, notably where grown on Horsea Island in Portsmouth Harbour, Hampshire. The tree was also selected for planting in the grounds of Highgrove House. 

Etymology
'Ademuz' (Valencian 'Ademus') is derived from the Arabic 'Ad-damus', which appears to mean 'impregnable', itself derived from the Greek αδαμαντ, the origin of the English words 'adamant' and 'diamond'. 

Accessions
Europe
Grange Farm Arboretum, Lincolnshire, UK. Acc. no. 1131. One small whip planted 2015.
Great Fontley Farm, Hampshire, UK. Butterfly Conservation'' elm trial plantation. Six trees planted 2014–2016.
Royal Botanic Garden Edinburgh, UK. Acc. no. 20180335 
Royal Botanic Gardens, Kew, UK. Acc. no. not known.
Sir Harold Hillier Gardens, Hampshire, UK. Ampfield Wood. Acc. no. 2017.0197
Icomb Place, Gloucestershire UK. 30 planted in the gardens and estate in 2023

References

Field elm cultivar
Ulmus articles with images
Ulmus
Technical University of Madrid elm clones